Sean DeLear (1965–2017) was a member of the “Silver Lake scene” of postpunk and powerpop artists and musicians living in Los Angeles's in the 1980s and 1990s. They were the lead singer of the band Glue.

Work 
DeLear was a collaborator with performance-based artists such as Vaginal Davis, Brian Grillo, and Kembra Pfahler. Later, DeLear was in the art collective Gelitin and performed as a solo cabaret artist in Sean DeLear on the Rocks.

They were a cultural boundary breaker and transcended sexuality, race, age, genres, and scenes.

References 

1965 births
2017 deaths
American punk rock singers
American performance artists
American cabaret performers
LGBT cabaret performers